KPVA-LP (92.7 FM) was a radio station licensed to Shelton, Nebraska, United States. The station was owned by Platte Valley Educational Radio, and broadcast a religious format.

On May 11, 2012, the licensee requested the cancellation of its license. The license was cancelled by the Federal Communications Commission and the call sign deleted from its database on May 31, 2012.

References

External links
 

Radio stations established in 2006
Radio stations disestablished in 2012
PVA-LP
2006 establishments in Nebraska
2012 disestablishments in Nebraska
Defunct religious radio stations in the United States
Defunct mass media in Nebraska
Christian radio stations in Nebraska